Various studies, from 1989 onwards, considered the reintroduction of trams to Edinburgh. In 2001, a proposal for a new Edinburgh Trams network envisaged three routes across the city, Lines 1, 2 and 3. Line 1 was a circular route running around the northern suburbs, with the other two forming radial lines running out to Newbridge in the west and to Newcraighall in the south respectively. All lines would run through the city centre.

Line 3 was later shelved due to lack of Scottish Parliament approval. Lines 1 and 2 were combined and split into three phases, with Phase 1 being further divided into Phase 1a and 1b. Phases 1b, 2 and 3 were not funded, and  only a truncated section of the planned Phase 1a line (running from the airport to the city centre) has  been  constructed.

Line 1 (North Edinburgh) 

Line 1 was planned to be a  circular route with 22 stops running around the northern suburbs, following a route from the City Centre, St Andrew Square, York Place, Picardy Place, down Leith Walk to Leith and Newhaven. The line would then run along the waterfront to Granton, where it would then loop back, taking over the disused Caledonian Railway route between via Crewe Toll to Wester Coates and Haymarket. Upon reaching Haymarket, trams will return to on-street running mode and head back along Princes Street.

Line 1 comprised  of on-street track integrated with other traffic,  of segregated track running along existing roads, and  separate tramway. The on-street sections of track would be in the centre of the road in some locations and at the kerbside in others. On the disused line to Granton, the tram line would be integrated with cycle and pedestrian pathways along the Roseburn wildlife corridor.

In the initial Phase 1a of the project, only the Newhaven-Leith Walk-Princes Street section of this route was included, with trams then continuing west to the airport (Line 2 route). Further construction of the Line 1 loop (Phase 1b of the project) was cancelled in 2009 due to financial constraints, postponing construction of the Haymarket-Granton section of this line indefinitely. Phase 2, which would complete the loop with a line from Granton Square to Newhaven, also remains unfunded.

Line 2 (West Edinburgh) 

Line 2 would have been an  route from the City Centre out to Edinburgh Airport via Edinburgh Park, with a branch line to Newbridge and a total of 19 stops. The airport route was subsequently incorporated into Phase 1a of the project. The branch to Newbridge is dependent on funding becoming available for Phase 3 of the construction project.

In Phase 1a, from St Andrew Square to Haymarket, a  line of on-street track integrates with other traffic along Princes Street and Shandwick Place. At Haymarket station, the tram line diverges from the road and runs down a segregated tramway via Haymarket Yards. The Line 1 branch north towards Granton (Phase 1b) would be located at the bridge over Russell Road. The Phase 1a line continues west, past the Haymarket rail depot and Murrayfield Stadium. Trams then move onto a dedicated track running parallel to the Edinburgh-Glasgow railway line, briefly crossing south of the railway to serve Sighthill and Edinburgh Park, before heading north, parallel to the City Bypass to the Gyle. The tramway then passes under the A8 road just the east of the Gogar Roundabout, turns west over green belt land, and then north behind the Hilton Hotel and alongside the Gogar Burn to a terminus within the existing airport bus station.

The planned branch to Newbridge would begin at the Ingliston stop, continuing west past the Royal Highland Showground, before crossing onto the central reservation of the A8. It would then turn south via Ratho Station to rejoin the Glasgow main line. At Harvest Road trams would switch to street-running mode again, sharing the road with traffic to the Newbridge industrial estate before crossing the A89 road and terminating at the Newbridge roundabout.

A preliminary guided bus service along part of the future route of Line 2, Fastlink, opened in December 2004. This concrete track, which ran parallel to the Edinburgh-Glasgow railway line from Saughton to Edinburgh Park, was converted to a tram track, replacing the guided bus service with the tram line.

On 27 September 2007, the Scottish Government announced the cancellation of the Edinburgh Airport Rail Link, a separate project to link mainline rail services to Edinburgh Airport. As an alternative, the government plans that an additional stop is built adjacent to a proposed Gogar railway station be constructed. This newly built rail station and tram stop would provide an interchange on the Fife Circle Line with airport tram services. Costs for this have not been stated and would be in addition to the currently budgeted-for amount.

The station in the Gogar area, just prior to the Gogarburn tram depot when going westbound, was opened on 11 December 2016, linking the Fife Circle Line to the Edinburgh tram network. It is called Edinburgh Gateway station.

Line 3 (South East Edinburgh) 

The proposals also featured a third tram line, which would run from the City Centre to the southern suburbs. The route was not finalised, but proposals indicated a preferred route would cross North Bridge and the Royal Mile, heading south past the University of Edinburgh, along Nicolson Street. An alternative route suggested trams could bypass the congested Nicolson Street and Clerk Street section by turning right into Nicolson Square and heading south along Potterrow. Southbound trams would return to Newington Road via West Preston Street, and a northbound track would run along Causewayside. A segregated track was proposed to cross Cameron Toll, and after crossing the Inch Park, trams would then run down the Old Dalkeith Road towards the Royal Infirmary of Edinburgh, and finally terminating at Newcraighall railway station park and ride. An extension to Musselburgh was also considered. City councillors also suggested that a route via London Road might be considered as an alternative extension to the network.

Line 3 was not approved by the Scottish Parliament and was not funded. Funding for the line depended on Edinburgh voters agreeing to a congestion charge, which was rejected in the Edinburgh road tolls referendum in 2005. Following the referendum defeat, Edinburgh City Council applied to the Scottish Government for £198 million funding for the line, but this request was turned down. As such, the proposal was put on hold indefinitely and does not form part of the approved phases, but the land needed for the line was protected until at least 2015.

Other proposals 

In addition to the three routes selected by transport planners, other proposals were put forward for inclusion in the tram network. Local campaigning groups have suggested that it would be possible to re-open the Edinburgh South Suburban Railway as an extension to Edinburgh trams. This proposal was rejected by the Scottish Parliament on ground of cost and the line will not be re-opened for the foreseeable future.

References 

 
Light rail in the United Kingdom
Transport in Edinburgh
Tram transport in Scotland
Public inquiries in Scotland
Public–private partnership projects in the United Kingdom
Proposed railway lines in Scotland
Lists of proposals
Infrastructure-related lists